Pierre d'Alençon is a French retired slalom canoeist who competed from the late 1940s to the mid-1950s. He won five medals at the ICF Canoe Slalom World Championships with four golds (C-1: 1949; C-1 team: 1949; C-2 team: 1951, 1953) and a bronze (C-2: 1953). He was from Paris.

References

French male canoeists
Possibly living people
Year of birth missing
20th-century French people
Medalists at the ICF Canoe Slalom World Championships